"The Long Night" is the third episode of the eighth season of HBO's medieval fantasy television series Game of Thrones, and the 70th episode overall. It was written by series co-creators David Benioff and D. B. Weiss, and directed by Miguel Sapochnik. First aired on April 28, 2019, it is the longest episode of the series, with a running time of 81 minutes.

"The Long Night" takes place entirely at Winterfell and depicts the final battle between the Army of the Dead and the combined armies of the living, ending one of the series' primary storylines. The episode's title refers to the prolonged winter that occurred thousands of years earlier, in which the White Walkers first descended upon Westeros.

The episode received generally positive reviews. Critics praised Arya Stark's storyline as its highlights, as well as the episode's direction and cinematography, while criticism targeted its handling of the White Walker conflict and the episode's production lighting. It received eleven Primetime Emmy Award nominations, including Outstanding Directing for a Drama Series, Outstanding Music Composition for a Series (Original Dramatic Score) for Ramin Djawadi, and Outstanding Guest Actress in a Drama Series for Carice van Houten  for her final performance as Melisandre. It was later picked by Alfie Allen and Maisie Williams to support their nominations for Outstanding Supporting Actor in a Drama Series and Outstanding Supporting Actress in a Drama Series, respectively. It received a total of five Primetime Emmy Awards.

This episode marks the final appearances of Carice van Houten (Melisandre), Megan Parkinson (Alys Karstark), and Vladimir Furdik (The Night King).

Plot 

With the Army of the Dead near Winterfell, Jon and Daenerys leave with Drogon and Rhaegal to await the Night King. Theon, Alys Karstark and the Ironborn escort Bran to the godswood. Tyrion takes refuge in the crypts with the other non-combatants and the army of the living assembles outside Winterfell. Melisandre arrives and enchants the Dothraki's arakhs to burn; the Dothraki and Ghost charge at the Army of the Dead, but are quickly overwhelmed. Daenerys, witnessing this, leaves to burn the wights with Drogon, but the living find themselves outnumbered. Arya convinces Sansa to hide in the crypts. Edd is killed saving Sam, and the survivors flee into Winterfell.

Jon and Daenerys unsuccessfully attempt to engage the Night King. Melisandre invokes R'hllor to ignite the trench surrounding Winterfell, but the wights use their bodies to dampen the fire, allowing them to breach the trench. A wight giant breaks through the castle walls and is killed by Lyanna Mormont as it crushes her to death, and the dead begin pouring into Winterfell.

Arya is saved from a wight by the flaming sword of Beric, who sacrifices himself so she and the Hound can retreat. They encounter Melisandre, who repeats her prophecy that Arya would "shut many eyes forever" ("The Climb"), emphasizing "blue eyes".

Jon, Daenerys, and the Night King are dismounted from their dragons. Jon attempts to charge the Night King, but is forced to flee when the Night King reanimates the dead, including those buried in Winterfell's crypts. Daenerys fights wights alongside Jorah, while Jon makes for the godswood, but he is stopped by Viserion.

In the godswood, Theon defends Bran to the last man, but is surrounded by the Night King and his wights. Bran thanks Theon, and Theon charges the Night King, who easily kills him with his own spear. The Night King approaches Bran and is drawing his sword when Arya arrives and leaps at him with the Valyrian steel dagger. The Night King catches her by the throat and dagger-wielding hand, but she drops the dagger to her other hand and stabs him, causing him and the army of the dead to disintegrate. She is too late to save Jorah, who dies from his wounds in Daenerys' arms.

As dawn breaks, Davos sees Melisandre leave Winterfell, rather than follow through on his promise to execute her ("The Winds of Winter"). Her life's purpose served, she removes her magical choker and collapses into dust in her old form.

Production

Writing 
The episode was written by David Benioff and D. B. Weiss.

Filming 
The episode was directed by Miguel Sapochnik. It was filmed in 55 night shoots over 11 weeks, and during harsh weather, at sets in Moneyglass, Saintfield and Belfast, Northern Ireland. Cinematographer Fabian Wagner described the shoot as "physically exhausting... they say don't work with animals or kids. We had everything times 100." Sapochnik studied the siege of Helm's Deep in The Lord of the Rings: The Two Towers to stage the battle scenes in a way "to not have an audience feel battle fatigue", claiming that "the less fighting you can have in a sequence, the better". He also shifted the moods from scene to scene to convey suspense, horror, action, and drama. He described the battle as "survival horror" comparable to Assault on Precinct 13 in its focus on a group besieged by outsiders.

The episode is said to contain the longest battle sequence in cinematic history, longer than the 40-minute Battle of Helm's Deep, as seen in The Lord of the Rings: The Two Towers.

Casting 

Country singer Chris Stapleton has a cameo appearance as a wight alongside his bass player and tour manager. Stapleton said his management contacted the show asking if he could be considered for a bit part in an episode and the producers invited him to fly to Belfast to film his scenes.

Reception

Ratings 
The episode was viewed by 12.02 million viewers on its initial live broadcast on HBO, and an additional 5.78 million viewers on streaming platforms, for a total 17.8 million viewers.

Critical response 
The episode received generally positive reviews; on review aggregator site Rotten Tomatoes, the episode holds an approval rating of 74%, based on 112 reviews, with an average rating of 8.79/10. The site's critical consensus reads, "Winter is here and Arya Stark may officially be the baddest woman in the land, but despite delivering some epic and emotional moments 'The Long Night' leaves a few things to be desired (lighting, anyone?) heading into the final stretch".

There was praise for the direction and cinematography, with James Hibberd for Entertainment Weekly describing it as "an action epic that manages to weave character-driven stories through clear and comprehensible battle...GoT continues to make every fight unique, compelling and grounded". Arya's unexpected defeat of the Night King was also praised. Alison Herman wrote for The Ringer: "That Arya was the one to seal the deal is heartening, at least...it was the woman who learned to master death and, ultimately, reject it, wielding the very weapon that caused her family so much grief". Myles McNutt wrote for The A.V. Club: "What was pitched by the fandom around the show as an episode rife for death pooling became an episode about a girl who has lost her entire adolescence training for this moment facing the realization that she was not as prepared as she thought, before gaining the confidence—foreknowledge?—to strike the winning blow”, allowing “the final moment to land despite an unavoidable feeling of anti-climax".

Many criticized the handling of the White Walker mythology, what was viewed as the lack of catharsis, and the use of dark production lighting which was seen as gratuitous, artistically unnecessary and disorienting. Caroline Fromke of Variety wrote: "After years of underlining just how huge and terrifying and all-consuming the threat of White Walker destruction would be, plunging back into 'who gets to sit on that pointy chair' will feel very silly." Zach Kram of The Ringer called it "a strangely unsatisfying conclusion to a story line that has sustained the show from the very beginning... it seems like those most central questions will remain forever unanswered." Some critics also said that the episode seemingly concluded the Azor Ahai prophecy arc without resolving it, as they expected Azor Ahai to kill the Night King, yet Arya Stark does not meet the prophecy's other requirements.

The conclusion of the White Walker storyline and its significance to the ending of the show caused debate among commentators. Erik Kain of Forbes argued that it was a perfect ending to what was ultimately a secondary storyline to Game of Thrones, writing, "The Night King (who isn't really in the books) is pretty one-dimensional and uninteresting. More to the point, he isn't really what these stories have ever been about ... Cersei is far, far more interesting and compelling, because she's a real person with real motivations and fears and love and hate and everything in-between." On the contrary, Alyssa Rosenberg of The Washington Post called the ending an "intellectual letdown, where a big episode of Game of Thrones felt like badly shot and edited fan service rather than a genuine revelation."

Beric Dondarrion's saving of Arya and subsequent death scene were generally well received. Jolie Lash of Collider called it "an emotional and courageous ending", and said by opening his eye after death instead of closing it, the "character remained intriguing". In interviews with actor Richard Dormer, Josh Wigler of The Hollywood Reporter and Leigh Blickley of The Huffington Post noted the barricade of the hallway (which some fans have named the "Bericade") was reminiscent of Hodor's iconic death in season 6, both selflessly suffering to defend the greater good; Dormer agreed and added it was also "almost Christ-like". Jack Shepherd of The Independent felt the death was "grisly, but purposeful" and gave the performance a 4/5 rating.

Ryan Grauer, an associate professor of international affairs told Vox that "the tension between good military tactics and good television came into conflict" in this episode. Mick Cook, an Afghanistan war veteran, agreed that the army of the living incorrectly placed its infantry, catapults and trench, and ineffectively used its wall defenses and light cavalry (Dothraki).

Tim Goodman of The Hollywood Reporter called the polarized reaction a demonstration of the impossibility of pleasing an entire audience of a television show with the scope of Game of Thrones, comparing it to the reception of the final seasons of Breaking Bad, Mad Men, The Sopranos, and The Wire. He wrote, "Fans (of television) are a combination of knowing exactly what they want from you and the story, not knowing what they want but willing to turn on you instantly if they don't get it, and some weird combination of happy but disappointed or let down, but also unwilling to trade the experience for anything [...] A consolation is that memory (and opinion) fades, and you're going into the magical, mythical Hall of Fame no matter what."

Awards and nominations

References

External links 
"The Long Night" at HBO.com

2019 American television episodes
Game of Thrones (season 8) episodes
Television episodes written by David Benioff and D. B. Weiss
Television episodes directed by Miguel Sapochnik